Helenium chihuahuense is a North American perennial plant in the sunflower family. It has been found only in the state of Chihuahua in northwestern Mexico.

Helenium chihuahuense is a branching annual herb up to 78 cm (31.2 inches) tall with thick rootstocks producing only one stem with a single flower head. The leaves are long, narrow and irregularly lobed. The head is spherical or egg-shaped, with many disc flowers, each yellow with purple tips. These are surrounded by about 14-15 yellow ray flowers.

References

External links
Photo of herbarium specimen at Missouri Botanical Garden, collected in Chihuahua in 1936, isotype of Helenium chihuahuense

Flora of Chihuahua (state)
Plants described in 1972
chihuahuense